Devil's Canyon is the eighth studio album by American southern rock band Molly Hatchet, released in 1996 (see 1996 in music). The album was recorded seven years after Lightning Strikes Twice, with only Danny Joe Brown of the original line-up.  During the recording of the album, Brown was forced to retire because of his precarious health condition and was replaced by Phil McCormack, who completed the vocal tracks.

The album cover was painted by British artist Paul Raymond Gregory.

Track listing
"Down from the Mountain" (John Galvin, Bobby Ingram, Phil McCormack) – 4:38
"Rolling Thunder" (Danny Joe Brown, Ingram, Banner Thomas) – 4:03
"Devil's Canyon" (Brown, Ingram) – 6:18
"Heartless Land" (Bryan Bassett) – 6:24
"Never Say Never" (Bassett, McCormack) – 3:46
"Tatanka" (Ingram, McCormack) – 5:01
"Come Hell or High Water" (Ingram, McCormack) – 3:40
"The Look in Your Eyes" (Galvin, Ingram, McCormack) – 6:08
"Eat Your Heart Out" (Mac Crawford) – 3:36
"The Journey" (Bassett, Crawford, Galvin, Ingram) – 7:20
"Dreams I'll Never See" (acoustic) (Gregg Allman) – 7:25

Personnel 
Molly Hatchet
Danny Joe Brown - lead vocals (credited but doesn't appear on the album)
Phil McCormack – lead vocals
Bobby Ingram – guitars, slide guitar, backing vocals, producer
Bryan Bassett – guitars, acoustic guitar, backing vocals
John Galvin – keyboards, orchestral arrangements
Andy McKinney – bass, backing vocals
Mac Crawford – drums, percussion, backing vocals, knee slapping

Additional musicians
Rolf Köhler - additional backing vocals
Mickey Barker - additional percussion

Production
Kalle Trapp – producer, engineer, mixing 
Rainer Hänsel - executive producer

References

Molly Hatchet albums
1996 albums
SPV/Steamhammer albums